Anthony Pedersen (born 5 May 1988) is a racing driver from New Zealand.

Career

V8 SuperTourers
In 2012, Pedersen was given the opportunity to run in the brand-new V8SuperTourer category in New Zealand and on the first ever race weekend, he was able to win the final race for International Motorsport. By the end of the season, Pedersen was able to finish sixth overall. In 2013, Pedersen came out firing managing to win four races, claim two pole positions and 11 podium finishes, which gave him second overall to Kiwi legend, Greg Murphy.

V8 Supercars

In 2014, Pedersen was selected to race the Super Black Racing wildcard entry at the 2014 Supercheap Auto Bathurst 1000 alongside fellow Kiwi Andre Heimgartner. Pedersen would again partner with Heimgartner for the 2015 endurance events.

Racing record

Career summary

Complete Bathurst 1000 results

References

External links
Career details from Driver Database
Profile on US Racing Reference
Articles, pictures & video's from Motorsport.com

1988 births
Living people
V8SuperTourer drivers